Patricia Maureen Grayburn, MBE, DL has a long involvement with the arts in Surrey after moving to become Arts Administrator at University of Surrey in 1983.

Biography
She was appointed a Deputy Lieutenant of Surrey in 2002 and was awarded MBE in 2004 for services to the arts. She is responsible for the Lewis Elton Gallery and the breadth of public art across the University of Surrey campus and her roles include Chair of the Guildford Book Festival, Executive Director of the Guildford International Music Festival and Committee member of  the Yvonne Arnaud Theatre Trust, Royal Ballet Benevolent Fund and Guildford Arts as well as other local societies.

Publications
 Gertrud Bodenwieser, 1890-1959: a celebratory monograph on the 100th anniversary of her birth. Ed. P. Grayburn (1990) National Resource Centre for Dance

Portrait of Grayburn
Grayburn agreed to sit for sculptor Jon Edgar as part of the preparations for The Human Clay exhibition in 2011. During the sitting Edgar, a sculptor of the Frink School learnt that whilst working for London County Council, Grayburn had commissioned the Blind Beggar and his Dog sculpture for Bethnal Green - one of Elisabeth Frink's earliest commissions.

References

External links
Pat Grayburn University of Surrey Arts 2011 film: "Is art in the mind of the artist... or the eye of the beholder?

British arts administrators
Women arts administrators
Deputy Lieutenants of Surrey
Members of the Order of the British Empire
People from the Borough of Guildford
Living people
Year of birth missing (living people)